Wrangler Lake is a lake located in Yellowstone National Park in the U.S. state of Wyoming. It is a few miles from the Wapiti Lake Trailhead.

Description
The Yellowstone Fly-Fishing Guide describes the lake as fishless. There is a  roundtrip trail which starts at Sour Creek in Yellowstone National Park and ends at Wrangler Lake.

Bill Schneider notes that Wrangler Lake has many mosquitos in June and July, and so recommends hiking later in the season.

References

Externals links 
 

Lakes of Wyoming
Lakes of Yellowstone National Park
Bodies of water of Park County, Wyoming